Ernest F. Pletschke is the name of the surveyor who platted Houghton, Michigan in 1854, prior to its incorporation as a village in 1861. In Houghton's first days it was said that "only thieves, crooks, murderers and Indians" lived there.

An Ernest F. Pletschke, most likely the same individual (though this is by no means certain) also was a leading citizen of nearby Outagamie County, Wisconsin during the American Civil War era. This Pletschke was a professor of German at Lawrence University in Appleton, Wisconsin. In November 1860, he and forty students formed a local militia company, with Pletschke as Captain and a Professor Pomeroy as First Lieutenant.
In April 1861, Professor Pletschke became the captain of the Appleton Light Infantry, with one T. R. Hudd as First Lieutenant. On May 31, 1861, Pletschke offered the services of his company to Adjutant-General William L. Utley in the Union's battle against the southern rebels; Utley accepted in early June, noting that the Appleton Light Infantry would likely be called upon within ten days. They were mustered into service soon after. His command was folded into the regiment of Colonel Frank J. Hecker of Illinois, where his captaincy was confirmed and made official.

Pletschke died in October 1861 at Louisville, Kentucky as a result of a relapse of typhoid fever, which he had contracted at some earlier, unspecified time. He was survived by a widow and a daughter.  His funeral was held in the Lawrence Memorial Chapel at Lawrence University.

See also

References

Union Army officers
People of Wisconsin in the American Civil War
1861 deaths
Year of birth missing
Lawrence University faculty
People from Appleton, Wisconsin
People from Outagamie County, Wisconsin
People from Houghton, Michigan
Military personnel from Michigan
Deaths from typhoid fever